

 River Lake (Nova Scotia) is the name of many lakes including the following:

Halifax Regional Municipality 

 River Lake located at 

 River Lake located at 

References
Geographical Names Board of Canada
Explore HRM
Nova Scotia Placenames

Lakes of Nova Scotia